Mujeeb Abdul Hakeem (born 20 November 1995) is a Ghanaian professional footballer who last played as a midfielder for Ghanaian Premier League side Accra Great Olympics. He previously played for Kumasi Asante Kotoko and served as captain for King Faisal Babes in 2019.

Career

Early career 
Hakeem played for Kumasi Asante Kotoko and Coners Babies FC at the early stages of his career. He later featured for Ghana Division One League side Bibiani Gold Stars.

King Faisal 
Ahead of the 2019–20 Ghana Premier League season, Hakeem was signed by Kumasi-based club King Faisal Babes. In December 2019, he was named as captain of the side. He made his debut in the first match of the season on 29 December 2019 in a 4–1 loss to Dreams FC. In February 2020, after an unimpressive run of matches with King Faisal languishing at the bottom of the table with 4 points as a result of drawing 4 matches and suffered 5 defeats in 9 league games, as captain he spoke at a club press conference and called on the supporters of the club to remain calm and keep supporting them in the difficult times. The league was later put on hold in March 2020 and cancelled in July 2020 due to the COVID-19 pandemic. He made 8 league matches that season. He later parted ways with the club after the two parties mutually terminated his contract in October 2020.

Great Olympics 
In October 2020, after parting ways with King Faisal, he signed a two-year contract with Teshie-based club Accra Great Olympics. Ahead of the 2020–21 Ghana Premier League season, he was named on the club's squad list for the season.

He didn't feature for the club but was named on the bench for 10 matches, before being released by the club at the end of the first round of the league season.

References

External links 

 

Living people
1995 births
Association football midfielders
Ghanaian footballers
King Faisal Babes FC players
Asante Kotoko S.C. players
Accra Great Olympics F.C. players
Ghana Premier League players